William Robert Moser (October 14, 1927April 11, 2003) was an American lawyer and judge, he was Judge of the Wisconsin Court of Appeals for 13 years. Earlier, he was a Wisconsin Circuit Court judge in Milwaukee County, and represented Milwaukee County in the Wisconsin State Senate as a Democrat.

Background
Moser was born October 14, 1927, in Chicago. He was educated in Milwaukee parochial schools (St. Michael's Elementary and St. John's Cathedral High School. From 1945-1947 he served in the United States Army as a paratrooper and a criminal investigator; then earned his Bachelor of Science degree at St. Norbert College, and LL.B. from Marquette University Law School, and went into practice as an attorney. He became a member of the Advisory Council to Mayor of Milwaukee Frank P. Zeidler, and a director or active member of various civic, veterans and fraternal organizations.

Legislative office
In 1956 he was elected to the 6th Senatorial District (the 7th, 10th, & 13th Wards of the City of Milwaukee) to succeed fellow Democrat William A. Schmidt, who was not running for re-election. Moser obtained a plurality in a four-way Democratic primary election against State Representative Cecil B. Brown Jr., former State Representative John Schaller, and Brown Deer village trustee Fred W. Voigt; and was unopposed in the general election. He served as the floor leader for Senate Democrats in the 1960 session, and was elected a Kennedy delegate to the 1960 Democratic National Convention. He easily turned aside challenges from Schaller in the 1960 primary, and from Republican Delbert Fowler in the general election; and served again as the Democratic floor leader in the 1961 session, leading the fight against the adoption of a sales tax in Wisconsin; but resigned effective Feb. 1, 1962 to become a Milwaukee County judge. He was succeeded by fellow Democrat Martin J. Schreiber.

Judiciary
In 1971, he was elected without opposition as a Wisconsin Circuit Court judge. He was re-elected in 1977, and in April 1978 was elected to the newly created Court of Appeals District 1. In 1980, he fended off a re-election challenge from Christ T. Seraphim, winning by 195,256 to 137,262. He was unopposed in 1986, and became Presiding Judge of the District 1 Court of Appeals. He did not run for re-election in 1992, and was succeeded on the Court by Charles B. Schudson.

Death
Moser died April 11, 2003, leaving behind a wife, Mary Bernadette, a son, William, and a daughter, Mary Magdalen.

References

1927 births
2003 deaths
Lawyers from Chicago
Marquette University Law School alumni
Politicians from Milwaukee
St. Norbert College alumni
Wisconsin Court of Appeals judges
Wisconsin lawyers
Wisconsin state court judges
Democratic Party Wisconsin state senators
20th-century American judges
Lawyers from Milwaukee
Military personnel from Milwaukee
20th-century American politicians
20th-century American lawyers